Rigas Feraios is the name of a Greek writer, political thinker and revolutionary.

It may also mean:
 Rigas Feraios (municipality), a municipality in Thessaly, Greece.
 Rigas Feraios (youth organization), the youth organization of the former Communist Party of Greece (Interior) (-1987) and of the Renewing Communist Ecological Left (1987-1999)
 A.C. Rigas Feraios Velestino, a football club in Velestino, Greece.